This article lists films which have had their theatrical releases cancelled, resulting in an alternative method of release, as well as films with delayed releases due to the COVID-19 pandemic. The article also lists productions which have been directly affected by the pandemic, resulting in their suspension or delay.

Theatrical releases

Simultaneous theatrical and video on demand (VOD) releases

North American theatrical releases

International theatrical releases

Brought forward

Delayed

Cancelled

Productions

Suspended

Delayed

Cancelled
 Batgirl
 Scoob! Holiday Haunt
Tomb Raider: Obsidian
Untitled Pirates of the Caribbean spin-off film

See also 
Impact of the COVID-19 pandemic on cinema
2020 in film
2021 in film
2022 in film
Impact of the COVID-19 pandemic on television

References

Notes

Citations

External links 
BBC, Talking Movies, Coronavirus puts film industry in 'turmoil', March 12, 2020
Shoard, Catherine, The Guardian, 'Over one hour everything was cancelled' – how coronavirus devastated the film industry, March 20, 2020
Burke, Kristin M., The Guardian, Reports of the death of the film industry have been greatly exaggerated, April 14, 2020
Crucchiola, Jordan, Vulture, Here Are All the Movies Delayed Because of the Coronavirus — With Some New Release Dates, July 24, 2020

F
2020 in film
 
 
Lists of films
 
F